Yashasvi Rishav (born 27 September 1997) is an Indian cricketer. He made his first-class debut on 27 January 2020, for Bihar in the 2019–20 Ranji Trophy, scoring 150 runs in the second innings. He made his List A debut on 24 February 2021, for Bihar in the 2020–21 Vijay Hazare Trophy. He made his Twenty20 debut on 4 November 2021, for Bihar in the 2021–22 Syed Mushtaq Ali Trophy.

References

External links
 

1997 births
Living people
Indian cricketers
Bihar cricketers
Place of birth missing (living people)